Star Wars: The Clone Wars is a 2008 American computer-animated epic space opera film directed by Dave Filoni, produced by Lucasfilm Ltd. and distributed by Warner Bros. Pictures, becoming the first Star Wars film to not be distributed by 20th Century Fox. It is the first fully animated film in the Star Wars franchise and takes place shortly after Episode II – Attack of the Clones, at the start of the titular Clone Wars. In the film, Count Dooku and Jabba the Hutt's uncle Ziro orchestrate a plan to turn Jabba against the Galactic Republic by framing the Jedi for the kidnapping of his son. While Anakin Skywalker and his newly assigned apprentice Ahsoka Tano attempt to deliver the child back to his father, Obi-Wan Kenobi and Padmé Amidala lead separate investigations to uncover Dooku and Ziro's plot.

The Clone Wars premiered on August 10, 2008, at Grauman's Egyptian Theatre, followed by a wide release five days later. It received largely negative reviews mainly due to its storytelling and animation style, and grossed $68.3 million worldwide, making it the lowest-grossing Star Wars film to date. The film serves as a pilot episode to the television series of the same name, which premiered on Cartoon Network two months after the film's release.

Plot

During the first year of the Clone Wars, Jedi Knight Anakin Skywalker and his master, Obi-Wan Kenobi, lead a small battalion of Republic Clone troopers led by Captain Rex against Count Dooku's Separatist droid army on the planet Christophsis. Awaiting reinforcements, the two Jedi greet a shuttle carrying a young Jedi Padawan named Ahsoka Tano, who insists that she has been assigned by Grandmaster Yoda to serve as Anakin's apprentice. Initially reluctant, Ahsoka earns Anakin's respect after the two succeed in deactivating the Separatists' energy field while Obi-Wan stalls the droid army commander, allowing a Republic victory.

Following the battle, Yoda arrives and informs the Jedi that gangster Jabba the Hutt's son Rotta has been kidnapped. The kidnapping has been planned by Dooku's Sith master Darth Sidious, who hopes to blame the Jedi for Rotta's kidnapping in order to get Jabba to ally with the Separatists and fuel anti-Jedi sentiment from the Hutts. Anakin and Ahsoka are tasked with retrieving the Huttlet, while Obi-Wan is sent to Tatooine to negotiate with Jabba over a potential treaty between the Hutts and the Republic. Anakin and Ahsoka track the kidnapper and Rotta to the planet Teth, where they are ambushed by Separatist forces led by Count Dooku's assassin and former Jedi Asajj Ventress. The Jedi manage to escape along with R2-D2 and hijack a derelict transport, which they use to travel to Tatooine. Obi-Wan, alerted by Anakin, arrives on Teth and engages Ventress in a lightsaber duel. Though Obi-Wan manages to defeat her, Ventress escapes, knowing she has failed.

Meanwhile, on Coruscant, Anakin's wife Senator Padmé Amidala learns of her husband's mission. Fearing for his safety, she confronts Jabba's uncle Ziro, who refuses to cooperate, apparently believing that it is the Jedi who are responsible for the situation. However, she soon discovers that Ziro has actually conspired with Dooku to have Rotta killed, so that Jabba would execute Anakin and Ahsoka, leading to his arrest by the Jedi Council, allowing Ziro to seize power over the Hutt Clan. Padmé is captured and imprisoned, but a chance call by C-3PO enables her to summon a squadron of clone troopers, and Ziro is arrested, despite revealing Dooku threatened to execute him if he did not cooperate with the conspiracy.

Arriving on Tatooine, Anakin devises a ruse to confront Dooku carrying a fake Rotta, while Ahsoka takes the real Rotta to Jabba's palace. While Anakin fights off Dooku, Ahsoka is ambushed by the MagnaGuards, whom she defeats with ease. The two deliver Rotta safely to Jabba, who nonetheless orders the Jedi to be executed for their supposed kidnapping attempt. However, Padmé contacts Jabba in time and reveals Ziro and the Separatists' responsibility for the kidnapping. Acknowledging the Jedi's heroism and allowing the Republic to have Ziro punished for his crimes, Jabba, in gratitude, agrees to the treaty before Anakin and Ahsoka are picked up by Obi-Wan and Yoda. Meanwhile, Dooku reports the plot's failure to Sidious, who assures him that the tide of the war is still in their favor.

Voice cast

 Matt Lanter as Anakin Skywalker, a former Jedi Padawan who has recently been promoted to the rank of Jedi Knight, and a general in the Republic's army, who leads the 501st Legion. Hayden Christensen was considered to reprise his role as Anakin from the prequel trilogy before Lanter was selected. Lanter replaces Mat Lucas, who voiced the character in the 2003 micro-series, Star Wars: Clone Wars.
 Ashley Eckstein as Ahsoka Tano, Anakin's new Padawan apprentice and commander of the 501st Legion.
 James Arnold Taylor as Obi-Wan Kenobi, a Jedi Master, Anakin's mentor, and general of the Republic, who leads the 212th Attack Battalion. Ewan McGregor was considered to reprise his role as Obi-Wan from the prequel trilogy before Taylor was selected. Taylor reprises his role from the Clone Wars micro-series.
 Taylor also voices 4A-7, a droid spy.
 Catherine Taber as Padmé Amidala, the queen and senator of Naboo and Anakin's wife. Natalie Portman was considered to reprise her role as Padmé from the prequel trilogy before Taber was selected. Taber replaces Grey DeLisle, who voiced the character in the Clone Wars micro-series.
 Tom Kane as Yoda, the Jedi Grandmaster and leader of the Jedi Council. Frank Oz was considered to reprise his role as Yoda from the prequel and original trilogies before Kane was selected. Kane reprises his role from the Clone Wars micro-series.  
 Kane also voices the Narrator, who explains the film's events and plot, and Admiral Yularen, an admiral of the Republic Navy assigned to Anakin.
 Dee Bradley Baker as the clone troopers, Captain Rex and Commander Cody. Baker replaces André Sogliuzzo, who voiced the characters in the Clone Wars micro-series.
 Christopher Lee as Count Dooku / Darth Tyranus, a Sith Lord and the puppet leader of the Separatist Alliance. Lee reprises his role from the prequel trilogy and for the last time before his death in 2015. The character is voiced by Corey Burton in the subsequent television series, who reprises his role from the Clone Wars micro-series. 
 Samuel L. Jackson as Mace Windu, a Jedi Master, senior member of the Jedi Council, and general of the Republic. Jackson reprises his role from the prequel trilogy. The character is voiced by Terrence C. Carson in the subsequent television series.
 Anthony Daniels as C-3PO, Anakin's protocol droid. Daniels reprises his role from the live-action films and also voiced C-3PO in other media.
 Nika Futterman as Asajj Ventress, a Sith assassin, a former Jedi and Count Dooku's disciple. Futterman replaces Grey DeLisle, who voiced the character in the Clone Wars micro-series.
Futterman also voices TC-70, Jabba's protocol droid.
 Ian Abercrombie as Chancellor Palpatine / Darth Sidious, the Supreme Chancellor of the Galactic Republic who is secretly a powerful Sith Lord in disguise, Count Dooku's master, and the mastermind behind the Clone Wars. Ian McDiarmid was considered to reprise his role as Palpatine from the prequel and original trilogies before Abercrombie was selected. Abercrombie replaces Nick Jameson, who voiced the character in the Clone Wars micro-series.
 Corey Burton as Ziro the Hutt, Jabba's uncle and a member of the Hutt Clan who is secretly in cahoots with Count Dooku and the Separatists.
 Burton also voices Whorm Loathsom, commander of the Separatist Droid Army occupying Christophsis, and KRONOS-327, an assassin droid working for Ziro.
 Kevin Michael Richardson as Jabba the Hutt, a powerful and notorious crime lord, the leader of the powerful Hutt Clan, and Rotta's father.
David Acord as Rotta the Huttlet, Jabba's son.
 Matthew Wood as the battle droids.

Production

Development

Star Wars: The Clone Wars was made to serve as both a stand-alone story and a lead-in to the weekly animated TV series of the same name. George Lucas had the idea for a film after viewing some of the completed footage of the early episodes on the big screen. Those first few episodes, originally planned for release on television, were then woven together to form the theatrical release. Warner Bros. had tracked the series' development from the beginning, and Lucas decided on a theatrical launch after viewing early footage declaring "This is so beautiful, why don't we just go and use the crew and make a feature?" This decision helped convince WB parent company Time Warner to distribute the movie, and to encourage its subsidiary Cartoon Network to air the series. Lucas described the film as "almost an afterthought." Howard Roffman, president of Lucas Licensing, said of the decision, "Sometimes George works in strange ways." Producer Catherine Winder said the sudden decision added to an already large challenge of establishing a show "of this sophistication and complexity," but she felt it was a good way to start the series, and thought budgetary constraints forced the production team to think outside the box in a positive way.

The story of the kidnapped Hutt was inspired by the Sonny Chiba samurai film Shogun's Shadow.

Animation
Lucasfilm and Lucasfilm Animation used Autodesk software to animate both the film and the series using the Maya 3-D modeling program to create highly detailed worlds, characters and creatures. The film's animation style was designed to pay homage to the stylized looks of both Japanese anime and manga, and the supermarionation of the British 1960s series Thunderbirds. At a Cartoon Network-hosted discussion, Lucas said he did not want the Clone Wars film or television series to look like such movies as Beowulf, because he wanted a stylized look rather than a realistic one. He also felt it should not look like the popular Pixar movies such as The Incredibles and Cars, because he wanted the film and characters to have its own unique style. Lucas also decided to create the animated film and series from a live-action perspective, which Winder said set it apart from other CGI films. Essentially, it "meant using long camera shots, aggressive lighting techniques, and relying on editing instead of storyboards." Animators also reviewed designs from the original 2003 Clone Wars series when creating the animation style for the film and the new series. In charge was Steward Lee, working as the storyboard artist during filming. Actors Samuel L. Jackson, Christopher Lee, Anthony Daniels, and Matthew Wood vocally reprised their respective roles as Mace Windu, Count Dooku, C-3PO and the B1 Battle Droids. However, Jackson and Lee did not reprise their roles in the television series.

Music

 
The musical score for Star Wars: The Clone Wars was composed by Kevin Kiner. The original motion picture soundtrack was released by Sony Classical on August 12, 2008. The disc begins with the main theme by John Williams, followed by more than 30 separate music cues composed by Kiner. Kiner is known for his work on such television series as Stargate SG-1, Star Trek: Enterprise, Superboy and CSI: Miami. The soundtrack uses some instruments never heard before in a Star Wars score, including erhus, duduks and ouds.

Marketing

Merchandise
Star Wars: The Clone Wars merchandise was first released on July 26, 2008. Hasbro released several 3-inch Clone Wars action figures, an electronic clone trooper helmet, a customizable lightsaber, and an electronic All Terrain Tactical Enforcer (AT-TE). Target and KB Toys also devoted shelf space for Clone Wars toys, but did not hold midnight releases or pursue the branding opportunities Toys "R" Us did. Toys "R" Us mounted digital clocks in all 585 of its stores that counted down to the release of the Clone Wars toys, and more than 225 of the stores opened at midnight for the debut of the Star Wars products. Two of the Toys "R" Us flagship outlets in Mission Bay, San Diego and Times Square in Manhattan, New York City held costume and trivia contests on July 26, and gave away limited-edition Star Wars toys with every purchase. A section of the Toys "R" Us website was also dedicated to The Clone Wars. The toy line continues with The Clone Wars figures being well received by collectors for their detail to the characters and vehicles.

Food partnership 
Due to Lucas' sudden decision to produce the film, Lucas Licensing did not have time to enter into agreements with previous Star Wars marketing partners like Pepsi, Burger King and Kellogg's, with which the Lucasfilm licensing company had a ten-year marketing plan for the other films. When questioned by The New York Times about Star Wars merchandising in July 2008, a Pepsi spokesperson was unaware a new Star Wars film was being released. On August 15, McDonald's held its first ever Happy Meal promotion for a Star Wars film and for four weeks, 18 exclusive toys came in specially designed Happy Meal boxes.

Print media
Dark Horse Comics published a six-issue digest-sized comic book miniseries. Randy Stradley, vice president of publishing for Dark Horse, said the sudden decision to release the Clone Wars film required the company to temporarily delay plans for two other Star Wars comic book series, Dark Times and Rebellion. The Clone Wars comics did not receive the promotional campaign it otherwise would have due to the abruptness of the theatrical and comic book releases. Topps, the trading cards company, released a series of 90 Clone Wars cards on July 26, which also included foil cards, motion cards, animation cel cards and rare sketch cards by top Star Wars artists and Lucasfilm animators. DK Publishing and the Penguin Group released books, activities and other merchandise that tied in with the film. Also released was the Clone Wars: The Visual Guide, published by DK, and Star Wars: The Clone Wars in the UK, published by Puffin and in the U.S. by Grosset & Dunlap. The publishers also released a storybook, picture books and an activity book. At the American International Toy Fair, Lego announced a product line for the film and the TV series, to be released in July 2008 in the United States and in August 2008 in the United Kingdom.

Video games
The LucasArts video game developer adapted the film into Star Wars: The Clone Wars – Jedi Alliance for the Nintendo DS and Star Wars: The Clone Wars – Lightsaber Duels for Wii. A reviewer from PocketGamer.co.uk said his expectations for Jedi Alliance were low due to poor Clone Wars movie reviews, but he found the game "a varied and well-paced experience." Lego Star Wars III: The Clone Wars adapted the film, along with episodes from seasons one and two of the 2008 TV series. The game released on all platforms in 2011.

Portable media players
A Star Wars: The Clone Wars MP3 player was released in August 2008. The player includes one gigabyte of memory, which holds 200 songs or 20 hours of music and comes with three interchangeable faceplates: a green one with Yoda and a lightsaber on it, a silver one with Captain Rex and a Galactic Empire logo on it, and one with two clone troopers on Coruscant. One review claimed it improved upon a Darth Vader MP3 player released in July 2008, which featured only 512 megabytes of memory and a dated visual display. A Star Wars iPod iSpeaker (a speaker/dock for iPods, iPhones and MP3 players) was also released. The speaker includes an image of Captain Rex and three other Clone Troopers.

Racing sponsorship
A Star Wars: The Clone Wars open wheel car for the IndyCar Series was unveiled at the 2008 San Diego Comic-Con International. The No. 26 car, which also included Blockbuster Inc. decals was driven by Andretti Green Racing driver Marco Andretti in the 2008 Peak Antifreeze Indy Grand Prix, Andretti later said of the spnsorship, "I'm hoping that my upcoming battle at Infineon will be as exciting as anything in a Star Wars movie so I can win it for both Blockbuster and Lucasfilm." The car finished 14th at Infineon on the lead lap, which Andretti attributed to a slow pit stop early in the race; he added, "I just don't think it was a very good performance for us today." The Clone Wars car was the second collaboration between Lucasfilm, Blockbuster and Andretti Green Racing. The first collaboration was an Indiana Jones and the Kingdom of the Crystal Skull car which was also ran by Andretti in the 2008 Indy 500 where it would finish in third place.

Novelization

A novelization of the film by Karen Traviss was released by Del Rey Books on July 26, 2008. In addition to narrating the film's plot from various points of view, it includes some of Anakin's memories of his early childhood as a Hutt slave, as well as some of Dooku's recollections of battling the Mandalorians (previously explored in the 2002 comic book Jango Fett: Open Seasons).

Release

Theatrical
The Clone Wars premiered on August 10, 2008, at Grauman's Egyptian Theatre, followed by a wide release five days later. It received largely negative reviews for its story, animation and repetitive action sequences and grossed $68.3 million worldwide, making it the lowest-grossing Star Wars film to date, but still a financial success due to its small budget.

Home media
The film's two-disc DVD and Blu-ray Disc was released on November 11, 2008, in the United States and on December 8, 2008, in the United Kingdom. The film was released as a single-disc DVD, two-disc Special Edition DVD, and Blu-ray Disc, all of which are THX certified. The standard-definition versions include the film in widescreen format with Dolby Digital 5.1 Surround EX sound, and with feature-length audio commentary.

The film is also available on the Disney+ streaming service, which launched on November 12, 2019.

Reception

Critical response
Star Wars: The Clone Wars received mostly negative reviews. The site's critical consensus reads: "Mechanical animation and a less-than stellar script make The Clone Wars a pale shadow of George Lucas' once great franchise." This constituted the lowest Rotten Tomatoes rating of any Star Wars film; all nine theatrical films ranged from 51% to 95% and the made-for-television Ewok films and the Star Wars Holiday Special garnered higher ratings, although their averages encompassed far fewer reviews. On Metacritic, the film has a weighted average score of 35 out of 100 based on 30 critic reviews, indicating "generally unfavorable reviews". Audiences polled by CinemaScore gave the film an average grade of "B−" on an A+ to F scale.

Entertainment Weekly listed Star Wars: The Clone Wars as one of the five worst films of 2008 with critic Owen Gleiberman saying, It's hard to tell the droids from the Jedi drones in this robotic animated dud, in which the George Lucas Empire Strikes Back—at the audience. What wears you out is Lucas' immersion in a Star Wars cosmology that has grown so obsessive-compulsively cluttered yet trivial that it's no longer escapism; Because this movie has bad lightsaber duels and the lack of the original cast, it's something you want to escape from.

Ain't It Cool News posted two reviews of the film during the week before its release, but pulled them down due to an embargo placed on those attending the screening its writers attended. The same reviews were re-posted on the site, on the day of the film's release. The retraction prompted some readers to allege a conspiracy by Lucasfilm to keep negative press out of circulation until the release of the film, but although the review by site creator Harry Knowles was negative, Drew McWeeny said that his review was positive and that no such conspiracy existed.

Several critics compared The Clone Wars to a Saturday morning cartoon and described it as little more than a plug for the upcoming animated series. Linda Barnard, of the Toronto Star, said the movie "pretty much drives a stake into the heart of every loyal fan of the movies. And now [George Lucas is] out to stick it to those too young to know about Jar Jar Binks." Variety magazine reviewer Todd McCarthy said, "This isn't the Star Wars we've always known and at least sometimes loved." Joe Neumiar, of the New York Daily News, wrote, "If this were a true Star Wars film, right about now somebody would say, '...I've got a bad feeling about this.'" In his review for Entertainment Weekly, critic Owen Gleiberman gave the film an F grade and wrote, "George Lucas is turning into the enemy of fun." Carrie Rickey, of The Philadelphia Inquirer, said, "The best that can be said about the movie is that it's harmless and mostly charmless. The Clone Wars is to Star Wars what karaoke is to pop music."

The main criticism toward the film was the animation. Many criticized it as cheap, wooden, non-engaging and out-of-date; some reviewers drew negative comparisons to 1960s marionette-based shows Thunderbirds and Fireball XL5, although George Lucas previously said the animation style was a deliberate homage to such shows. Tom Long of MediaNews said the animation "is downright weak compared to what's generally seen onscreen these days" and that the characters are so stiff they look like they were "carved by Pinocchio's father." Roger Ebert gave the film 1.5 stars out of 4 and said "the characters have hair that looks molded from Play-Doh, bodies that seem arthritic, and moving lips on half-frozen faces—all signs that shortcuts were taken in the animation work." McCarthy said "the movements, both of the characters and the compositions, look mechanical, and the mostly familiar characters have all the facial expressiveness of Easter Island statues." However, some of the same reviewers who criticized the animation acknowledged some positive elements about it; McCarthy said it allowed for "somewhat more dramatic compositions and color schemes," and Carrie Rickey, of The Philadelphia Inquirer, said the scenery and backgrounds were "vivid and alive", although she said the characters "move as you would imagine the statues at a waxworks might."

Reviewers also criticized the dialogue, which Ebert said was limited to "simplistic declamations" and Claudia Puig of USA Today described as "stilted and overblown, a problem also in some of the live-action incarnations." Many critics also said that the battle scenes were repetitive and lacked tension; McCarthy described the action sequences as "a little exposition, an invasion; some more exposition, a lightsaber fight; a bit more blah-blah, a spaceship dogfight, and on and on." Linda Stasi, of the New York Post, also described the lack of character development in the film, writing that whereas the original Star Wars films dedicated time to allowing viewers to get to know the characters, "Director Dave Filoni is so concentrated on the action that we're never given the chance to care who lives and who is blown into spare parts." Jason Anderson, of the Globe and Mail, wrote that although The Clone Wars is intended for younger audiences, "parents may be perturbed by the film's relentless violence." Ebert also found protagonist Ahsoka Tano "annoying," and Michael Rechtshaffen, of The Hollywood Reporter, said the attempts of humor amid the bickering between Ahsoka Tano and Anakin Skywalker are "strained". Puig said she enjoyed the character, and that "her repartee with Anakin enlivens things."

Box office
The Clone Wars earned $68,282,845 worldwide, including $35,161,554 in North American domestic box office grosses and $33,121,290 in international grosses. The film earned $14,611,273 on 3,452 screens in its opening weekend, including $6,228,973 on its opening day, August 15. It was the third-highest earning film of the weekend in spite of negative critical reception, behind Tropic Thunder and The Dark Knight, which earned $25.8 million and $16.3 million, respectively. Dan Fellman, head of distribution for Warner Bros., said that the box office performance met expectations because two-thirds of the audience were families and the budget for the film was $8.5 million, frugal considering it was a CGI film and because the film was meant to introduce the animated series. Fellman said, "It was targeted to a specific audience for specific reasons. We accomplished that mission, and it will continue in another medium." When The Clone Wars dropped to $5.6 million in its second week of release, ContactMusic.com described it as "the first bona fide Star Wars flop." The film also earned $23,428,376 from DVD sales in the US.

Accolades
The film was nominated for a Golden Raspberry Award in the category "Worst Prequel, Remake, Rip-Off or Sequel", but lost to Indiana Jones and the Kingdom of the Crystal Skull.

References

External links
 
  at 
 
 
 

Star Wars: The Clone Wars
2008 films
2000s English-language films
2008 computer-animated films
2000s adventure films
2008 science fiction action films
2000s American animated films
American sequel films
American animated science fiction films
American science fiction action films
American science fiction war films
American science fantasy films
American space adventure films
Animated science fiction films
Animated space adventure films
Animated war films
Films about cloning
Military science fiction films
2000s science fiction adventure films
Films scored by Kevin Kiner
Interquel films
Star Wars spin-off films
Lucasfilm films
Lucasfilm animated films
Warner Bros. films
Warner Bros. animated films
American children's animated science fiction films
Films with screenplays by Henry Gilroy
American prequel films